Voices in the Wind is the fourth studio album by American country music singer Suzy Bogguss. It was released on October 6, 1992 via Liberty Records. It earned her a second straight gold record and her highest-charting single ever, the No. 2 cover of John Hiatt's "Drive South."

"Letting Go," a single from Aces which was co-written by Bogguss's husband Doug Crider, peaked at No. 6 on the Billboard Hot Country Songs chart not long before the release of Voices in the Wind. In an effort to capitalize on the single's success, it was included on the later album as well.

Track listing

Personnel
Suzy Bogguss - Lead and backing vocals

Additional musicians
Bucky Baxter - electric guitar, pedal steel guitar
Eddie Bayers - drums, backing vocals
Gerald Alan Boyd - acoustic guitar, electric guitar, backing vocals
Sam Bush - mandolin
David Campbell - string arrangements, conductor
Bob Carpenter - backing vocals
Beth Nielsen Chapman - backing vocals
Doug Crider - backing vocals
Dan Dugmore - pedal and lap steel guitars
Jimmie Fadden - harmonica
Vince Gill - electric guitar, backing vocals
John Guess - backing vocals
Jeff Hanna - backing vocals
Ted Hewitt - backing vocals
Mike Henderson - slide and electric guitars, backing vocals
Jimmy Ibbotson - backing vocals
John Barlow Jarvis - keyboards, DX-7 Synthesizer
Kirk "Jelly Roll" Johnson - harmonica
Abe Medic - backing vocals
Mark Morris - percussion, backing vocals
Johnny Neel - keyboards
Mark O'Connor - fiddle, violin
Mike Reid - backing vocals
Tom Roady - percussion
Matt Rollings - piano, backing vocals
Brent Rowan - electric guitar, backing vocals
Leland Sklar - bass, backing vocals
Karen Staley - backing vocals
Harry Stinson - backing vocals
Janie West - backing vocals

Production
Producer: Jimmy Bowen, Suzy Bogguss
Engineer: John Guess, Frank Wolf, Roger Nichols
Assistant Engineer: Marty Williams
String Engineer: Frank Wolf
Mixing: John Guess, Marty Williams
Digital Editing, Mastering: Glenn Meadows
Conductor, Arranger: David Campbell
Conductor, String Contractor: Suzie Katayama
Concert Master: Sid Page
Art Direction: Virginia Team
Photography: Randee Saint Nicholas
Design: Jerry Joyner
Stylist: Vanessa Ware
Hair Stylist, Make-Up: Mary Beth Felts
Distributor: EMI Music Dist.
Studio: Emerald Sound Studio, Nashville, TN.

Chart performance

Album

Singles

Certifications
RIAA Certification

Release details

References

1992 albums
Suzy Bogguss albums
Liberty Records albums
Albums produced by Jimmy Bowen